Combined events at the Summer Olympics have been contested in several formats at the multi-sport event. There are two combined track and field events in the current Olympic athletics programme: a men's decathlon (100 metres, long jump, shot put, high jump, 400 metres, 110 metres hurdles, discus throw, pole vault, javelin throw, and 1500 metres) and a women's heptathlon (100 metres hurdles, high jump, shot put, 200 metres, long jump, javelin throw, and 800 metres).

The first men's events came at the 1904 Summer Olympics: a triathlon had long jump, shot put, and 100-yard dash events, while an all-around championship saw athletes compete over ten events, forming the basis for the decathlon. No combined events were held at the subsequent games, but the 1912 Summer Olympics saw the introduction of the modern decathlon event and also a men's pentathlon (which lasted for three games). The first women's event came in 1964 in the form of the women's pentathlon. This was amended to include two more events, becoming the heptathlon at the 1984 Summer Olympics, reflecting the development of women's sport.

The Olympic record in the decathlon is 9018 points, set by Canadian athlete Damian Warner in 2021. Jackie Joyner-Kersee's score of 7291 points to win in 1988 is both the current Olympic and world record for the heptathlon – this remains the only occasion that record has been broken at the Olympics. The men's decathlon world record has had a strong link with the competition, with the Olympic gold medalist breaking the world record in 1928, 1932, 1936, 1952, 1972, 1976, and 1984.

Five men have won two Olympic combined event titles. Bob Mathias, Daley Thompson and Ashton Eaton have all won back-to-back decathlon titles, Jim Thorpe won both the decathlon and pentathlon titles in 1912, and Eero Lehtonen won two Olympic pentathlon titles. Jackie Joyner-Kersee is the most successful athlete, having won two Olympic heptathlon titles and, with her further silver medal, is the only combined events competitor to have won three Olympic medals.

In 1912, Thorpe was designated the "World's Greatest Athlete" by Gustav V of Sweden and this title is traditionally given to the reigning Olympic decathlon champion in the media. Thorpe's two gold medals were stripped in 1913 on the grounds that he had broken amateurism rules (having taken expense money for playing baseball), but the International Olympic Committee restored him as the champion in 1982, 30 years after his death, admitting that the protest against Thorpe’s eligibility was not brought within required 30 days (other medalists were not demoted).

The 1906 Intercalated Games, now not considered an official Olympic event, featured an event based on the Ancient Olympic pentathlon, combining four track and field events with a wrestling match.

Medal summary

Men's decathlon

Multiple medalists

Medals by country

 The German total includes teams both competing as Germany and the United Team of Germany, but not East or West Germany.

Women's heptathlon

Multiple medalists

Seven women have won multiple medals in Olympic heptathlon, while an eighth achieved this feat in the earlier Olympic Pentathlon. OF these, only Jackie Joyner-Kersee has won three medals.

Medals by country

Defunct events

Men's all-around
Consisted of 100 yards, shot put, high jump, 880 yd walk, hammer throw, pole vault, 120 yd hurdles, weight throw, long jump and mile run.

Men's triathlon
Consisted of long jump, shot put, and 100 yards.

Men's pentathlon 
Consisted of long jump, javelin throw, 200 metres, discus throw, and 1500 metres. Eero Lehtonen was the most successful athlete in the event's three-edition history, winning two of the three gold medals on offer and being the only person to reach the podium twice.

Women's pentathlon
Consisted of 100 metres hurdles, shot put, high jump, long jump, and 200 metres. In 1980, the 200 metres was replaced by the 800 metres. Burglinde Pollak, a bronze medalist in 1972 and 1976, was the only woman to win two Olympic pentathlon medals during its five-edition history.

Intercalated Games
The 1906 Intercalated Games were held in Athens and at the time were officially recognised as part of the Olympic Games series, with the intention being to hold a games in Greece in two-year intervals between the internationally held Olympics. However, this plan never came to fruition and the International Olympic Committee (IOC) later decided not to recognise these games as part of the official Olympic series. Some sports historians continue to treat the results of these games as part of the Olympic canon.

No strictly track and field combined event featured on the programme, as happened at the 1904 Summer Olympics, but the Greeks introduced a variation of the Ancient Olympic pentathlon. This contained four track and field events – standing long jump, ancient-style discus throw, javelin throw and a stadion race (192 m) – with the final event being Greco-Roman wrestling.

American Martin Sheridan was the initial favourite, having already won gold and silver medals in individual jump and throws events, but dropped out due to injury. Lawson Robertson and István Mudin each won two of the rounds (Robertson the long jump and stadion, Mudin the discus and wrestling), but it was Sweden's Hjalmar Mellander who won the gold medal with 24 points. The Swede never finished in the top two of a round, but he performed consistently, never below seventh place in the 27-man field. Mudin of Hungary took a close second place with 25 points. Third place was taken by another Swede, Eric Lemming, who later went on to win two consecutive Olympic gold medals in the javelin throw.

Notes

References
Participation and athlete data
Athletics Athletics Men's Pentathlon Medalists. Sports Reference. Retrieved on 2014-05-22.
Athletics Men's Decathlon Medalists. Sports Reference. Retrieved on 2014-05-22.
Athletics Men's All-Around Championship Medalists. Sports Reference. Retrieved on 2014-05-22.
Athletics Women's Pentathlon Medalists. Sports Reference. Retrieved on 2014-05-22.
Athletics Women's Heptathlon Medalists. Sports Reference. Retrieved on 2014-05-22.
Olympic record progressions
Mallon, Bill (2012). TRACK & FIELD ATHLETICS - OLYMPIC RECORD PROGRESSIONS. Track and Field News. Retrieved on 2014-02-07.
Specific

External links
IAAF heptathlon homepage
IAAF decathlon homepage
Official Olympics website
Olympic athletics records from Track & Field News

Olympics
Combined events